The Minnesota Junior Hockey League (MnJHL) was a USA Hockey-sanctioned Tier III junior ice hockey league operated out of Minneapolis-Saint Paul.

History
Established in 1974, the MnJHL developed players 20 years old and younger for over 40 years. Many MnJHL players, coaches and officials alumni have moved on to college hockey and professional hockey leagues.

Since the inaugural season, the MnJHL had expanded up to 17 teams in the 2014–15 season with teams in Minnesota, Wisconsin, Illinois, Indiana, Michigan, Missouri and Ohio.

The league has a history of USA Hockey national championship teams. League members won national championships six times in the 1990s.

In 2012, the MnJHL expanded outside of the Minnesota and Wisconsin areas adding teams from the Great Lakes Junior Hockey League. The GLJHL switched from USA Hockey to the Amateur Athletic Union and eight of its teams refused to go with it. The eight Great Lakes Division teams formed their own division in the MnJHL while the original teams compete in the Minnesota Division. The Great Lakes Division would be renamed the Central Division prior to the 2014–15 season.

The league also expanded into southern Minnesota for 2012–13. Steele County Blades, based in Owatonna, were approved by the league board and play out of Four Seasons Centre.

The United States Premier Hockey League announced on December 18, 2014, the formation of a Midwest Division to begin in the 2015–16 season by adding the entire Central Division of the MnJHL. By the end of the season most of the remaining teams in the MnJHL (all teams other than the Rochester Ice Hawks and the dormant Twin Cities Northern Lights) had announced their intentions to join the USPHL Midwest. On April 29, 2015, it was announced that the league had disbanded for the 2015–16 season. On May 21, 2015, the Rochester Ice Hawks were approved to join the North American 3 Hockey League (NA3HL) to begin playing in the 2015–16 season. In June, the Wooster Oilers would drop out of the USPHL and only field a team in the NA3HL using the Cleveland Jr. Lumberjacks franchise it had purchased on February 12, 2015. Prior to starting their first season in the USPHL, the Ironwood Fighting Yoopers and Minnesota Owls announced they would go dormant for the 2015–16 season due to lack of players, the Crystal Lake Rampage were replaced with the Chicago Cougars, the Fort Wayne Federals were replaced with the Indiana Attack but ceased operations prior to their first season, the Hudson Crusaders were renamed the SCV Magicians, the St. Louis Frontenacs were renamed the St. Louis Storm but ceased operations prior to their first season, and the Maple Grove Energy were relocated to become the Blaine Energy.

Teams at the conclusion of the 2014–15 season

Former teams
 Central Wisconsin Saints (2012–2014) - relocated and became the Wisconsin Rapids Riverkings
 Chicago Jr. Bulldogs (2012–2013) - joined from GMJHL, moved to NA3HL
 Dubuque Thunderbirds (2000–2006) - moved to CSHL
 Edina Jr. Stingers - folded
 Granite City Lumberjacks (2007–2011) - moved to NA3HL
 Iron Range Yellow Jackets (1999–2002) -  folded
 Minnesota Flying Aces (2007–2011) - moved to NA3HL
 Minnesota Wildcats (2005–2011) - folded and replaced with the Maple Grove Energy.
 Jr. Kodiaks (?–2000) – folded
 North Suburban Hawks – folded
 South Suburban Steers – became the Twin Cities Northern Lights
 St. Louis (Twin Bridges) Lightning (2004–2005) - sold & relocated to Maple Grove (Minnesota Wildcats)
 Shattuck-St. Mary's Sabres (?–2003) - team now plays a Midget Major schedule in CSDHL
 Tri-Metro Whalers - folded
 Wisconsin Mustangs (2004–2010) -  moved to SIJHL
 Wisconsin Rampage (?–2013) relocated to Crystal Lake, Illinois

Playoff champions

National champions 
 1989–90: Northland Voyageurs
 1991–92: Northland Voyageurs
 1992–93: West Suburban Kodiaks
 1994–95: Minneapolis Kodiaks
 1996–97: Jr. Kodiaks
 1998–99: East Metro Lakers

References

External links
 MnJHL.com

3
Junior
1974 establishments in Minnesota
Sports leagues established in 1974
2015 disestablishments in Minnesota
Sports leagues disestablished in 2015